Pierre De Bruyne (born 1905, date of death unknown) was a Belgian cyclist. He competed in the sprint event at the 1924 Summer Olympics.

References

External links
 

1905 births
Year of death missing
Belgian male cyclists
Olympic cyclists of Belgium
Cyclists at the 1924 Summer Olympics
Place of birth missing